NewsGuard is a journalism and technology tool that rates the credibility of news and information websites and tracks online misinformation. It operates a browser extension and mobile apps for consumers as well as services for businesses, including a brand safety tool for advertisers and services for search engines, social media apps, cybersecurity firms, and government agencies.

NewsGuard's trust ratings for news websites are based on nine criteria related to a source's journalistic practices. Based on the nine criteria, each site is assigned a trust score of 0-100 and an overall rating of red (generally untrustworthy) or green (generally trustworthy). The rating is accompanied by a "Nutrition Label" that explains why the site received its rating on each of the nine criteria. NewsGuard says it has rated more than 6,000 news sources that account for 95% of engagement with news in the United States, United Kingdom, France, Germany, and Italy.

NewsGuard operates a consumer-facing browser extension and mobile apps for iOS and Android that label news sources with a red or green icon indicating the site's rating and enable users to read each site's "Nutrition Label" from NewsGuard. Supported browsers for the browser extension include Google Chrome, Microsoft Edge, Firefox, and Safari. It is included by default in the mobile version of Edge, though users must enable it.

Background 
NewsGuard Technologies was founded in 2018 by Steven Brill and L. Gordon Crovitz, who serve as co-CEOs.  Investors include the Knight Foundation and Publicis.  The NewsGuard extension is installed in browsers and warns users when they view content from what it considers fake news websites. Journalists employed by NewsGuard Technologies score news sites on their reliability and general trustworthiness. The analysis is designed to be transparent and includes the name of the staffer who analyzed the site. Sites that score at least 60 out of 100 points based on nine criteria display a green icon next to their name, and ones that score lower get a red. Users can optionally read more information, including how the sites fared in each criterion.  The extension can also highlight potential conflicts of interest, such as websites that do not disclose that they are financed by lobbying groups.

NewsGuard determines a website's overall credibility score based on a number of criteria. These include:
 The frequency of publication of inaccurate information
 The extent of sourcing and original reporting of information
 The degree of demarcation between news and opinion journalism
 The accuracy of headlines, including the use of clickbait headlines
 The degree of disclosure of the website's ownership, as well as the political positions of the owners

Brill positions the extension as an alternative to government regulation and automated algorithms, such as those used by Facebook.  For revenue, NewsGuard Technologies licenses their ratings.  Clients include technology companies and the advertising industry, who view the ratings as a way to protect clients against advertising on sites that could harm their brand. In January 2019, the extension was integrated into the mobile version of Microsoft Edge, though users must enable it.  Sites that had previously ignored the extension, such as MailOnline, objected to being listed as unreliable.  The decision to list MailOnline as unreliable was reversed, and NewsGuard admitted they were wrong on some counts.  Sites labeled as unreliable include InfoWars, the Daily Kos, Sputnik, RT, WikiLeaks, and MSNBC.  NewsGuard has been criticized by Breitbart News as "the establishment media's latest effort to blacklist alternative media sites".  NewsGuard attempts to work with sites they label as unreliable to advise them on how to come into compliance with their criteria.

NewsGuard expanded its coverage to news in European languages such as French and German ahead of the 2019 European Parliament election.

In April 2019, the co-founders of NewsGuard announced that they had entered talks with British internet service providers to incorporate their credibility scoring system into consumer internet packages. Under the plans, a user would see a warning message before visiting a misleading site without needing to have the NewsGuard extension installed. Users would also have the ability to disable the feature.

In January 2020, NewsGuard began notifying users that it would become a paid, member-supported browser extension in early 2020, while remaining free for libraries and schools. Early adopters would get a 33% discount on the price, paying $1.95/month (USD) or £1.95/month (UK). They plan to roll out new premium features, including a reliability score, and offer new mobile apps for Android and iOS. They reported ratings of "3,800 websites that account for 95% of engagement with news in the U.S., U.K., France, Germany and Italy."

As of January 2021, NewsGuard says it has rated for more than 6,000 news sites that account for 95% of online engagement with news in the U.S., the U.K., France, Germany and Italy.

See also 
 Ad Fontes Media
 AllSides
 Media Bias/Fact Check
 Michael Hayden

References

External links 
 

Google Chrome extensions
Microsoft Edge extensions
Nonfree Firefox WebExtensions
Fake news
Internet properties established in 2018